Pandu College, established in 1962, is a general degree college situated in Guwahati, Assam. This college is affiliated with the Gauhati University. This college offers different Degree and Post Graduate courses in arts, commerce and science.

References

External links
http://www.panducollege.org

Universities and colleges in Assam
Colleges affiliated to Gauhati University
Educational institutions established in 1962
1962 establishments in Assam